Tenuta is an Italian word meaning estate. It may refer to:

 Jon Tenuta (born 1957), American football coach
 Juan Manuel Tenuta (1924–2013), Argentinian-Uruguayan actor (es)
 Judy Tenuta (1956–2022), American entertainer
 Luke Tenuta (born 1999), American football player
 Saverio Tenuta (born 1969), Italian comics artist (it)

See also
 Tenuta dell'Ornellaia, Italian wine producer
 Tenuta di San Liberato, Bracciano, estate in Italy
 Tenuta San Guido, Italian wine producer